Warren H. Spencer (August 22, 1921 – March 11, 1991) was a Republican member of the Pennsylvania House of Representatives.

References

Republican Party members of the Pennsylvania House of Representatives
1921 births
1991 deaths
20th-century American politicians